Comin' Down the Road: The Concert at Royal Albert Hall is a DVD release from John Fogerty released on November 3, 2009. The DVD features songs from Fogerty's show at Royal Albert Hall during his 2008 tour.

Track listing
 All tracks written by John Fogerty unless noted.

 "Comin' Down the Road"
 "Born on the Bayou"
 "Lookin' Out My Back Door"
 "Rambunctious Boy"
 "Don't You Wish It Was True"
 "My Toot Toot" (Sidney Simien)
 "Commotion"
 "Creedence Song"
 "Ramble Tamble"
 "Gunslinger"
 "I Will Walk with You"
 "Somebody Help Me"
 "Broken Down Cowboy"
 "Keep On Chooglin'"
 "Southern Streamline"
 "Blue Ridge Mountain Blues" (Traditional)
 "Almost Saturday Night"
 "Rock and Roll Girls"
 "Down on the Corner"
 "Hey Tonight"
 "Up Around the Bend"
 "The Old Man Down the Road"
 "Fortunate Son"
 "Travelin' Band"
 "Rockin' All Over the World"
 "Proud Mary"

Personnel
 John Fogerty – vocals, guitar
 Jason Mowery – fiddle, mandolin
 Billy Burnette – guitar
 Hunter Perrin – guitar
 Shane & Tyler Fogerty – guitar (on Up Around the Bend)
 Matt Nolen – keyboards, guitar
 David Santos – bass
 Kenny Aronoff – drums
 Oren Waters – background vocals
 Jodie Kennedy – background vocals
 Gloria Johnson – background vocals

Certifications

References

External links
 John Fogerty | Official Website
 

John Fogerty video albums
2009 video albums
Live video albums
2009 live albums
Live albums recorded at the Royal Albert Hall